Louisiana's 2011 state elections were held on October 22, 2011, with runoff elections held on November 19. All statewide elected offices were up, as well as all seats in the Louisiana State Legislature.

Statewide offices

Governor

Incumbent Governor Bobby Jindal, a Republican, ran for a second term, and faced only token opposition. He was expected to win by a wide margin, and ended up winning with nearly 66% of the vote.

Lieutenant Governor

Incumbent Lieutenant Governor Jay Dardenne was elected in a 2010 special election, and was elected to a full term. His opponent was Republican Billy Nungesser Jr., the Plaquemines Parish president.

Results
Unofficial results from the Secretary of State website.

Attorney General

Incumbent Attorney General Buddy Caldwell was elected as a Democrat in 2007, but switched parties in early 2011. Former Congressman Joseph Cao, also a Republican, filed to run against Caldwell, but dropped out of the race shortly after, leaving Caldwell unopposed.

Commissioner of Agriculture and Forestry
Incumbent Commissioner Michael G. Strain, a Republican, was first elected in 2007. He faced Democrat Jamie LaBranche, an arborist and horticulturist, and Reform Party candidate Belinda "B" Alexandrenko, a three-time gubernatorial candidate. He was re-elected with 66.5% of the vote.

Results
Unofficial results from the Secretary of State website.

Commissioner of Insurance
Incumbent Commissioner Jim Donelon, a Republican, was first elected in a 2006 special election. His opponent was Democrat Donald C. Hodge, an attorney, who he defeated by a 2 to 1 margin.

Results
Unofficial results from the Secretary of State website.

Secretary of State
Incumbent Secretary of State Tom Schedler, a Republican, was appointed to the position following Jay Dardenne's election as Lieutenant Governor. He faced Louisiana House of Representatives Speaker Jim Tucker, also a Republican, who he narrowly defeated.

Results
Unofficial results from the Secretary of State website.

State Treasurer

Incumbent Treasurer John Neely Kennedy, a Republican, was first elected in 1999. He was unopposed.

State Legislature

Louisiana Senate
Prior to the election, Republicans held 22 seats in the Louisiana Senate, while Democrats held 17. In the jungle primary, the Republicans gained a net of two Senate seats, giving them 24 seats to the Democrats' 15 seats. All four runoffs were intraparty runoffs.

Louisiana House of Representatives
Prior to the election, the Louisiana House of Representatives consisted of 57 Republicans, 46 Democrats, 2 Independents, and one vacancy. After the jungle primary the House makeup stood at 54 Republicans, 40 Democrats, 1 Independent, and 10 to be determined in runoff elections.  In the runoffs not featuring two candidates of the same party, 5 Democrats, 4 Republicans and one Independent candidate were elected, so after the runoff elections the House makeup stood at 58 Republicans, 45 Democrats and 2 Independents.

References

 
Louisiana